Our Short Life is a 1981 East German drama film directed by Lothar Warneke. It was entered into the 12th Moscow International Film Festival.

Cast
 Simone Frost as Franziska Linkerhand
 Hermann Beyer as Schafheutlin
 Gottfried Richter as Trojanowicz
 Dietrich Körner as Professor Reger
 Christian Steyer as Jazwauk
 Christine Schorn as Gertrud
 Barbara Dittus as Frau Hellwig
 Dieter Knust as Verwalter
 Helmut Straßburger as Kowalski
 Annemone Haase as Frau Kowalski
 Uwe Kockisch as Wolfgang

References

External links
 

1981 films
1981 drama films
East German films
German drama films
1980s German-language films
Films directed by Lothar Warneke
1980s German films